The 2008 Copa Sudamericana de Clubes was the seventh edition of the Copa Sudamericana football tournament. The draw for the tournament took place on June 10, 2008 in Buenos Aires and the competition was played between July 30 and December 3. Arsenal de Sarandí were the defending champions, having won the trophy the previous season. Brazilian side Internacional won the 2008 tournament, becoming the first Brazilian winners of the trophy.

Qualified teams 
A total of 34 teams are participating in the 2008 Copa Sudamericana, from 12 associations (10 from CONMEBOL and 2 from CONCACAF).

Preliminary stage 

The Preliminary Stage opened the Copa Sudamericana. All the second berths of 8 South American football associations contested this round. The four winners advanced to the First Round. Team #1 played at home first.

|}

First stage 
The First Stage consisted of twenty-eight teams each playing two-legged matches. Twenty-four teams qualified directly to this round. The fourteen winners advanced to the Round of 16. Team #1 played at home first.

|}

Knockout stages 

(*)Indicates that the team plays at home for the first leg

Round of 16 
The Second Stage was the Round of 16, played by the fourteen winners from the First Round, plus River Plate and Boca Juniors. As in the First Round, these teams played two-legged matches. Team #1 played at home first.

|}

Quarterfinals 
The Quarterfinals was played by the eight winners from the Round of 16. As in the First Round, these teams played two-legged matches. Team #1 played at home first.

|}

Semifinals 
The Semifinals was played by the four winners from the Quarterfinals. As in the First Round, these teams played two-legged matches. Team #1 played at home first.

|}

Finals 

The Finals were played by the two winners from the Semifinals. As in the First Round, these teams played two-legged matches. Team #1 played at home first.

|}

Champion

References 

 
Copa Sudamericana seasons
2